Shin-hye, also spelled Sin-hye, is a Korean feminine given name. The meaning differs based on the hanja used to write each syllable of the name. There are 25 hanja with the reading "shin" and 16 hanja with the reading "hye" on the South Korean government's official list of hanja which may be registered for use in given names.

People with this name include:
Queen Sinhye, first wife of King Taejo of Goryeo
Hwang Shin-hye (born 1963), South Korean actress 
Bang Sin-hye (born 1967), South Korean hurdler
Park Shin-hye (born 1990), South Korean actress

See also
List of Korean given names

References

Korean feminine given names